Spencer Karen Grammer (born October 9, 1983) is an American actress best known for her roles as the voice of Summer Smith in the Adult Swim animated science-fiction series Rick and Morty and as Casey Cartwright in the ABC Family college comedy-drama series Greek.

Early life
Spencer Grammer was born in Los Angeles, California. She is the daughter of actor Kelsey Grammer and Doreen Alderman, and was named after her paternal aunt, Karen, who was murdered in 1975. She has six paternal half-siblings: three half-sisters (the actress Greer Grammer, Mason, and Faith) and three half-brothers (Jude, Gabriel, and James). She also has a maternal half-sister named Madison. She attended Marymount Manhattan College in New York City.

Career
Grammer's first role was as a child, appearing uncredited on the show Cheers.

Grammer played the female lead, Casey Cartwright, in the ABC Family series Greek. The show followed the life of a sister (Grammer) and her brother, Rusty Cartwright, played by Jacob Zachar, as they navigate college and life within the world of the Greek system sororities and fraternities in a midwestern Ohio college town.

In 2013, Grammer starred opposite Blair Underwood in Ironside, the remake of the popular 1960s television series of the same name. The show was canceled after three episodes aired. Since 2013, Spencer has lent her voice to the character of Summer Smith on the award-winning Adult Swim animated science fiction series Rick and Morty.

Personal life
Grammer married James Hesketh, a firefighter, on February 11, 2011. On October 10, 2011, she gave birth to their son, Emmett Emmanual Hesketh. In November 2017, Hesketh filed for divorce from Grammer.

Filmography

References

External links

1983 births
Living people
American television actresses
American soap opera actresses
Actresses from Los Angeles
20th-century American actresses
21st-century American actresses
Marymount Manhattan College alumni
American child actresses
Los Angeles County High School for the Arts alumni
Columbia University alumni
American people of British descent
American people of United States Virgin Islands descent